James Adam McSweeney (born 24 October 1980) is an English kickboxer and retired mixed martial artist. A professional MMA competitor since 2005, McSweeney is well known for being a cast member of Spike TV's The Ultimate Fighter: Heavyweights and competing in the UFC, but he has also competed in major European promotions such as KSW, Cage Rage and BAMMA.

Background
Born in London to an Irish father and a Northern Irish mother, McSweeney started kickboxing in England when he was six years old. At 18, he finished school and moved to Amsterdam to train full-time in Dutch kickboxing. He joined Lucien Carbin's gym, and still trains with the team today. Team mates and sparring partners have included Alistair Overeem, Valentijn Overeem, and Tyrone Spong. An accomplished kickboxer and Muay Thai fighter, McSweeney has won numerous British, Dutch, European and World titles.

Mixed martial arts career
In 2006, McSweeney transitioned to mixed martial arts and moved in with The Ultimate Fighter coach Rashad Evans. The two quickly struck up a bond after McSweeney helped prepare Evans for his bout against Forrest Griffin in December 2008. While training for his fight against Travis Browne, McSweeney switched his camp from Jackson's Submission Fighting in Albuquerque, New Mexico to the Grudge Training Centre in Denver, Colorado to train full-time along with fellow UFC competitors Shane Carwin, Brendan Schaub and Nate Marquardt. McSweeney recently moved out of the Grudge Training Centre to return to the tutelage of European Muay Thai legend Lucien Carbin and to open up his own gym Sledgehammer MMA in Kent, England.

The Ultimate Fighter
McSweeney was on The Ultimate Fighter: Heavyweights fighting alongside Team Rashad. McSweeney was the first overall pick and fought on the second episode of the show against Wes Shivers defeating him via majority decision. McSweeney moved on to the next round of the tournament, fighting teammate, Matt Mitrione. McSweeney won via guillotine choke in the first round. In the semi-finals, McSweeney lost against former IFL Heavyweight Champion Roy Nelson via TKO after getting caught in the crucifix position.

Ultimate Fighting Championship
McSweeney was given another chance by the UFC despite losing on The Ultimate Fighter. He fought Darrill Schoonover on The Ultimate Fighter: Heavyweights Finale card in Las Vegas, Nevada, on 5 December, winning by TKO in the third round.

McSweeney made his second appearance for the UFC on The Ultimate Fighter: Team Liddell vs. Team Ortiz Finale preliminary card, fighting against undefeated newcomer Travis Browne. The fight ended in a TKO victory for Browne due to punches at 4:32 of the first round. McSweeney claims he was hit with illegal elbows and briefly tried to appeal the loss. McSweeney later decided against the appeal to focus on his next fight instead.

McSweeney was to drop to the Light Heavyweight division at UFC 120 to fight Tom Blackledge. However, McSweeney would instead face Fábio Maldonado after Blackledge was forced to pull out of the bout. McSweeney lost the bout in the third round via TKO due to punches.

As of 20 January 2011, conversations over McSweeney's Twitter account were strongly indicative that he is no longer a part of the UFC.

Independent Promotions

McSweeney lost a unanimous decision to former UFC Heavyweight Champion Ricco Rodriguez at BAMMA 5: Daley vs Shirai on 26 February 2011. He then had a further loss to submissions ace Francisco France in April 2011 at a Crowbar MMA event. Fighting on 22 July 2011, Mcsweeney defeated Lee Mein by TKO (Punches) in the 1st round. On 20 August 2011, McSweeney defeated Sam Brown by Submission (armbar) in the 1st round.

McSweeney faced former MFC Light Heavyweight Champion Emanuel Newton at Superior Cage Combat 3. He lost by submission in the first round.

McSweeney faced fellow UFC veteran Paul Buentello in a Light Heavyweight bout on 23 August 2013 at Legacy Fighting Championship 22. He lost the fight via TKO in the second round.

ONE Fighting Championship
In 2014, McSweeney signed with the Asian promotion ONE Championship. He faced Chris Lokteff in his debut at ONE Fighting Championship: Rise of Heroes in May and won via KO due to a flying knee in round 1.

In his second fight for the promotion, McSweeney faced Cristiano Kaminishi at ONE FC: Reign of Champions in August. He again won the fight via KO in the first round.

For his third fight with the promotion, McSweeney faced Roger Gracie at ONE FC 23: Warrior's Way in December. He lost the fight via TKO in the third round.

KSW
McSweeney was expected to face Polish prospect Michal Andryszak at KSW 45 on 6 October 2018. However, Andryszak was pulled from the event due to injury and was replaced by Thiago Silva. McSweeney lost the fight by unanimous decision.

McSweeney faced Hatef Moeil at Mix Fight Championship 26 on June 22, 2019, losing the bout via first-round technical knockout. In September 2021, McSweeney announced that he had retired from mixed martial arts competition in order to continue his kickboxing career.

Kickboxing career
Having already fought in numerous kickboxing bouts during his career, McSweeney signed with Glory in September 2021. He was scheduled to face Antonio Plazibat at Glory: Collision 3 on 23 October 2021. However, Plazibat was replaced by Gökhan Saki after Plazibat replaced Jamal Ben Saddik against Benjamin Adegbuyi. McSweeney lost by second-round knockout via leg kicks. In December 2022, McSweeney defeated Bugra Erdogan to win the Mix Fight Heavyweight Championship. The event took place in Frankfurt, Germany.

Personal life
McSweeney is married with one daughter. They reside in Plano, Texas. He is a former security guard. On 15 August 2012, he stopped an attempted robbery at a convenience store in Las Vegas by subduing a man armed with a knife.

Championships and accomplishments

Kickboxing
Mix Fight Championship 
Mix Fight Heavyweight Champion (one time, current)

Kickboxing record (Incomplete)

|-  bgcolor="#CCFFCC"  
| 2022-12-03 || Win ||align=left| Bugra Erdogan || Mix Fight Championship || Frankfurt, Germany || Decision (Split) || 3 || 3:00
|-  bgcolor="#FFBBBB"
| 2021-10-23 || Loss ||align=left| Gökhan Saki || Glory: Collision 3 || Arnhem, Netherlands || KO (Leg Kicks) || 2 || 2:13
|-  bgcolor="#FFBBBB"
| 2019-12-07 ||  Loss ||align=left| Ismael Londt || Mix Fight 27, Heavyweight Tournament Final || Frankfurt, Germany || TKO (Doctor Stoppage) || 2 ||  
|-  bgcolor="#CCFFCC"  
| 2019-12-07 || Win||align=left| Murat Aygün|| Mix Fight 27, Heavyweight Tournament Semi Final || Frankfurt, Germany || TKO (Doctor Stoppage)|| 2 || 
|-  bgcolor="#CCFFCC"  
| 2018-12-01 || Win ||align=left| Danyo Ilunga || Mix Fight Gala 25 || Germany || KO (Spinning Backfist) || 3 ||  1:10  
|-  bgcolor="#CCFFCC"  
| 2018-01-27 || Win ||align=left| Firouz Fakhri || Mix Fight Gala 24 || Izmir, Turkey || KO (Knee) || 2 || 2:29 
|-  bgcolor="#FFBBBB"  
| 2008-04-22 || Loss ||align=left| Brian Douwes || K-1 World Grand Prix 2008 in Amsterdam || Amsterdam, Netherlands || KO (Left Hook) || 1 || 1:10 
|-  bgcolor= "#CCFFCC"
| 2008-03-29 || Win ||align=left| Marin Došen || WFC 4 || Ljubljana, Slovenia || TKO (Flying Knee) || 2 || 
|-  bgcolor="#CCFFCC"
| 2007-04-21 || Win ||align=left| Michael McDonald  || Cage Rage 21: Judgement Day || London, England || Decision (Majority) || 3 || 3:00 
|-  bgcolor="#FFBBBB"
| 2006-02-17 || Loss ||align=left| Roman Kupcak || K-1 European League 2006 in Bratislava || Bratislava, Slovakia || KO (Strikes) || 2 || 
|-  bgcolor="#FFBBBB"
| 2005-12-10 || Loss ||align=left| Koos Wessels || Fights at the Border IV || Lommel, Belgium || Decision || 3 || 3:00
|-
| colspan=9 | Legend:

Mixed martial arts record

|-
| Loss
| align=center| 15–18
| Hatef Moeil
| TKO (punches) 
| Mix Fight Championship 26
| 
| align=center| 1
| align=center| 4:13
| Hessen, Germany
| 
|-
| Loss
| align=center| 15–17
| Thiago Silva
| Decision (unanimous) 
| KSW 45: The Return to Wembley
| 
| align=center| 3
| align=center| 5:00
| London, England
| 
|-
| Loss
| align=center| 15–16
| Fernando Rodrigues Jr.
| Decision (unanimous) 
| Superior Challenge 17
| 
| align=center| 3
| align=center| 5:00
| Stockholm, Sweden
| 
|-
| Loss
| align=center| 15–15
| Tai Tuivasa
| TKO (corner stoppage)
| Australian Fighting Championship 17
| 
| align=center| 1
| align=center| 5:00
| Melbourne, Australia
| 
|-
| Loss
| align=center| 15–14
| Karol Bedorf
| TKO (elbows)
| KSW 34: New Order
| 
| align=center| 1
| align=center| 3:33
| Warsaw, Poland
| 
|-
| Win
| align=center| 15–13
| Marcin Różalski
| Submission (rear-naked choke)
| KSW 32: Road to Wembley
| 
| align=center| 1
| align=center| 2:13
| London, England
| 
|-
| Loss
| align=center| 14–13
| Denis Goltsov
| TKO (head kick and punches)
| Tech-Krep FC - Prime Selection 4: Grandmasters
| 
| align=center| 2
| align=center| 0:46
| Krasnodar, Russia
|
|-
| Loss
| align=center| 14–12
| Roger Gracie
| TKO (front kick to the body and punches)
| ONE FC 23: Warrior's Way
| 
| align=center| 3
| align=center| 3:15
| Pasay, Philippines
|
|-
| Win
| align=center| 14–11
| Cristiano Kaminishi
| KO (punch and soccer kick)
| ONE FC: Reign of Champions
| 
| align=center| 1
| align=center| 1:17
| Dubai, United Arab Emirates
|
|-
| Win
| align=center| 13–11
| Chris Lokteff
| KO (flying knee)
| ONE Fighting Championship: Rise of Heroes
| 
| align=center| 1
| align=center| 3:04
| Pasay, Philippines
|
|-
| Win
| align=center| 12–11
| Stefan Traunmuller
| Submission (armbar)
| FFC09: McSweeney vs. Traunmuller
| 
| align=center| 1
| align=center| 0:35
| Ljubljana, Slovenia
| 
|-
| Loss
| align=center| 11–11
| Paul Buentello
| TKO (body punch)
| Legacy FC 22
| 
| align=center| 2
| align=center| 2:44
| Lubbock, Texas, United States
|
|-
| Win
| align=center| 11–10
| Dion Staring
| TKO (head kick and punches)
| CFA 10: McSweeney vs. Staring
| 
| align=center| 1
| align=center| 0:38
| Coral Gables, Florida, United States
|
|-
| Loss
| align=center| 10–10
| Matti Mäkelä
| TKO (punches)
| Superior Challenge 8
| 
| align=center| 2
| align=center| 0:00
| Malmö, Sweden
|
|-
| Win
| align=center| 10–9
| Jeff King
| Submission (rear-naked choke)
| Shamrock Events Kings of Kombat 7
| 
| align=center| 1
| align=center| 2:30
| Melbourne, Australia
|
|-
| Win
| align=center| 9–9
| Kym Robinson
| TKO (punches and elbows)
| Shamrock Events Night of Mayhem 4
| 
| align=center| 1
| align=center| 3:03
| Dandenong, Victoria, Australia
| 
|-
| Win
| align=center| 8–9
| Felis Leniu
| Submission (rear-naked choke)
| Shamrock Events Kings of Kombat 6
| 
| align=center| 1
| align=center| 0:00
| Keysborough, Victoria, Australia
| 
|-
| Win
| align=center| 7–9
| Doug Viney
| Submission (rear-naked choke)
| Shamrock Events Kings of Kombat 5
| 
| align=center| 1
| align=center| 2:30
| Keysborough, Victoria, Australia
|
|-
| Loss
| align=center| 6–9
| Emanuel Newton
| Submission (rear-naked choke)
| Superior Cage Combat 3
| 
| align=center| 1
| align=center| 1:45
| Las Vegas, Nevada, United States
|
|-
| Win
| align=center| 6–8
| Sam Brown
| Submission (armbar)
| Shamrock Events Kings of Kombat 4
| 
| align=center| 1
| align=center| 2:25
| Melbourne, Australia
|
|-
| Win
| align=center| 5–8
| Lee Mein
| TKO (punches)
| Bully's Fight Night 2
| 
| align=center| 1
| align=center| 2:01
| Lethbridge, Alberta, Canada
|
|-
| Loss
| align=center| 4–8
| Francisco France
| Submission (kimura)
| Crowbar MMA Spring Brawl 2011
| 
| align=center| 1
| align=center| 1:35
| Fargo, North Dakota, United States
|
|-
| Loss
| align=center| 4–7
| Ricco Rodriguez
| Decision (unanimous)
| BAMMA 5: Daley vs. Shirai
| 
| align=center| 3
| align=center| 5:00
| Manchester, England
| 
|-
| Loss
| align=center| 4–6
| Fábio Maldonado
| TKO (punches)
| UFC 120
| 
| align=center| 3
| align=center| 0:48
| London, England
| 
|-
| Loss
| align=center| 4–5
| Travis Browne
| TKO (punches)
| The Ultimate Fighter: Team Liddell vs. Team Ortiz Finale
| 
| align=center| 1
| align=center| 4:32
| Las Vegas, Nevada, United States
|
|-
| Win
| align=center| 4–4
| Darrill Schoonover
| TKO (punches and knees)
| The Ultimate Fighter: Heavyweights Finale
| 
| align=center| 3
| align=center| 3:20
| Las Vegas, Nevada, United States
|
|-
| Loss
| align=center| 3–4
| Ricardo Romero
| Submission (rear-naked choke)
| Ring of Combat 24
| 
| align=center| 1
| align=center| 2:27
| Atlantic City, New Jersey, United States
|
|-
| Loss
| align=center| 3–3
| Neil Grove
| KO (punches)
| UCMMA 1: Bad Breed
| 
| align=center| 2
| align=center| 1:38
| London, England
|
|-
| Win
| align=center| 3–2
| Roman Webber
| KO (knee)
| Cage Rage 28
| 
| align=center| 1
| align=center| 0:10
| London, England
|
|-
| Win
| align=center| 2–2
| Chris Cooper
| TKO (punches)
| FX3: Fight Night 9
| 
| align=center| 1
| align=center| 3:09
| Reading, Berkshire, England
|
|-
| Loss
| align=center| 1–2
| Mostapha al-Turk
| TKO (punches)
| Cage Rage 27
| 
| align=center| 1
| align=center| 2:06
| London, England
| 
|-
| Loss
| align=center| 1–1
| Robert Paczków
| Submission (smother choke)
| Cage Rage 24
| 
| align=center| 1
| align=center| 2:09
| London, England
|
|-
| Win
| align=center| 1–0
| Mark Buchanan
| TKO (punches)
| Cage Rage 22
| 
| align=center| 1
| align=center| 1:30
| London, England
|

Mixed martial arts exhibition record

|-
| Loss
| align=center| 2–1
| Roy Nelson
| TKO (punches)
| The Ultimate Fighter: Heavyweights
|
| align=center| 1
| align=center| 4:13
| Las Vegas, Nevada, United States
| 
|-
| Win
| align=center| 2–0
| Matt Mitrione
| Submission (guillotine choke)
| The Ultimate Fighter: Heavyweights
|
| align=center| 1
| align=center| 3:38
| Las Vegas, Nevada, United States
| 
|-
| Win
| align=center| 1–0
| Wes Shivers
| Decision (majority)
| The Ultimate Fighter: Heavyweights
|
| align=center| 2
| align=center| 5:00
| Las Vegas, Nevada, United States
|

Bare-knuckle boxing

|-
|Loss
|align=center|0–1
|Lavar Johnson
|KO (punch)
|Valor Bare Knuckle 1
|
|align=center|1
|align=center|0:27
|New Town, North Dakota, USA
|

See also
List of male kickboxers
List of male mixed martial artists

References

External links
 
 
  at K-1

1980 births
Living people
English male mixed martial artists
Light heavyweight mixed martial artists
Heavyweight mixed martial artists
Mixed martial artists utilizing Muay Thai
Mixed martial artists utilizing Brazilian jiu-jitsu
English male kickboxers
Heavyweight kickboxers
English Muay Thai practitioners
English practitioners of Brazilian jiu-jitsu
People awarded a black belt in Brazilian jiu-jitsu
Sportspeople from London
English people of Irish descent
British expatriates in Thailand
British expatriates in the United States
Ultimate Fighting Championship male fighters
Bare-knuckle boxers